
Gmina Koprzywnica is an urban-rural gmina (administrative district) in Sandomierz County, Świętokrzyskie Voivodeship, in south-central Poland.

Villages
Apart from the town of Koprzywnica, Gmina Koprzywnica contains the villages and settlements of Beszyce, Błonie, Ciszyca, Dmosice, Gnieszowice, Kamieniec, Krzcin, Łukowiec, Niedźwice, Postronna, Sośniczany, Trzykosy, Zarudcze, Zbigniewice and Zbigniewice-Kolonia.

Neighbouring gminas
Gmina Koprzywnica is bordered by the city of Tarnobrzeg and by the gminas of Klimontów, Łoniów and Samborzec.

References

Polish official population figures 2006

Koprzywnica
Sandomierz County